Ido Erev holds a PhD from the University of North Carolina, 1990 in Cognitive/Quantitative Psychology.

Erev is a full professor at the Technion's Faculty of Data and Decision Sciences.

Academic contribution

Erev is widely regarded for his contributions to learning in behavioral economics and experimental economics.

His work with Nobel Laureate Alvin Roth has started a branch of behavioral economics focused on human learning in games and individual choice tasks.

He is also widely regarded for his distinction between decision from experience and decisions from description 

Another line of research involves practical implications. and law enforcement.

References

External links
 Ido Erev: "Big data without big brothers: the potential of gentle rule enforcement"
 "The impact of experience on the phenomena summarized by prospect theory" was presented in The D-TEA (Decision: Theory, Experiments, and Applications) Zoom meeting on Prospect Theory, June 16-19, 2020
 Ido Erev lecture in London Judgment and Decision Making seminars, 21st October 2020

Academic staff of Technion – Israel Institute of Technology
University of North Carolina alumni
Living people
Year of birth missing (living people)